Januário dos Santos de Jesus (born 22 June 1991 in Olhão) is a Portuguese footballer who plays for S.C. Olhanense as a forward.

Football career
On 2 August 2015, Jesus made his professional debut with Olhanense in a 2015–16 Taça da Liga match against Penafiel.

References

External links

1991 births
Living people
People from Olhão
Portuguese footballers
Association football forwards
S.C. Olhanense players
Sportspeople from Faro District